Doyle High School is a public high school in Livingston, Louisiana, United States. It serves right under 700 students in grades 6–12. 

The school's principal is Lance Dawsey and the assistant principal is Janet Keller.

Athletics
Doyle High athletics competes in the LHSAA. The school's athletic mascot is the Fighting Tiger, and its school colors are purple and gold.

Notable alumni
Dale M. Erdey (Class of 1972), state senator from Livingston, Tangipahoa, and East Baton Rouge parishes

References

External links

Greatschools.net - Doyle High School

Schools in Livingston Parish, Louisiana
Public high schools in Louisiana
Public middle schools in Louisiana